JHOVE (JSTOR/Harvard Object Validation Environment) - pronounced "jove" - is a format-specific digital object validation API written in Java. JHOVE was a joint project of JSTOR and the Harvard University Library to develop an extensible framework for format validation. The Open Preservation Foundation took over stewardship of JHOVE in February 2015.

JHOVE is currently available for downloading as version 1.22.  It is licensed under the LGPLv2.  The download includes both a command line and a GUI version.  It is designed so that third parties can attach different "heads" to the software, and so can be integrated with other applications that need to validate files.  It can be run on any Unix, Windows, or Macintosh OS X platform which supports Java 1.6.

Currently supported formats are AIFF, ASCII, Bytestream, GIF, HTML, JPEG, JPEG 2000, PDF, TIFF, UTF-8, WAV, and XML.  Documents are analyzed and checked for being well-formed (consistent with the basic requirements of the format) and valid (generally signifying internal consistency). JHOVE notes when a file satisfies specific profiles within formats (e.g., PDF/X, HTML 4.0).

A successor called JHOVE2 is currently available; however, it has a completely separate code base, and was last updated in 2014.

References

External links
 Official project page. (Last updated 2015-07-09; accessed 2015-07-09.)
Github page. (Last modified 2015-07-09; accessed 2015-07-09.)
OPF Evaluation and Stabilisation Plan  Report carried out by the Open Preservation Foundation to outline all of the JHOVE resources that it intends to maintain or preserve. 
COPTR JHOVE in the Community Owned digital Preservation Tool Registry (COPTR) (Last updated 2015-07-09; accessed 2015-07-09.)
Ensuring long-term access: PDF validation with JHOVE? User experience blog (Last updated 2014-12-17; accessed 2015-07-09.)
Artefactual: DROID, JHOVE, NLNZ Metadata Extractor. The purpose of these three tools is to identify and validate formats and extract technical metadata. (Last modified on 14 May 2009; accessed 2012-12-18)
Carlpedia: Carleton College Wiki. Jhove is a program used by the Archives to extract metadata from digital objects. This article explains how to download, install, and run Jhove on the Mac OS X operating system. (Last edited Oct 04, 2011; accessed 2012-12-18)
Digital Curation Centre  (Last reviewed 16 February 2012; accessed 2012-12-18)

Computer files
Free system software
Free software programmed in Java (programming language)
Harvard University